Tropicimonas sediminicola is a Gram-negative, obligately aerobic, rod-shaped and motile bacterium from the genus of Tropicimonas which has been isolated from marine sediments from an ark clam farm from the coast of Korea.

References 

Rhodobacteraceae
Bacteria described in 2009